The Unfortunate Son (original Spanish title: "El hijo desafortunado") is a short story by Argentine author Alejandro Carrascosa.

The story was reportedly written in 1922 and given to poet Ricardo Molinari before Carrascosa's disappearance in September of that year. Molinari has said that he forgot about the manuscript until he rediscovered it in 1926 and shared it with the editors of the literary magazine Martin Fierro, who published it in early 1927.

Because of the style, themes, and the circumstances surrounding the story, some scholars believe that it was actually written by Jorge Luis Borges and only published under Carrascosa's name.

Plot summary
During minor renovations at a municipal building outside of Geneva, a small, hidden library is discovered. A reporter, sent to cover the discovered library, mistakenly notes that one of the books uncovered is Moments of Secret Geneva, instead of Moments of Social Geneva. The editor of the magazine, in a rush, furthers the mistake to Members of Secret Geneva, which is what he publishes in the paper.

A student named Simon Slatkin reads the article and becomes curious about Members of Secret Geneva. Unknown to the editor, Secret Geneva was an underground resistance movement that had worked to undermine French occupation during the Napoleonic Wars. Simon believes his grandfather was a member of Secret Geneva, but had been misrepresented as a French sympathizer, the infamy of which had driven Simon and his mother to move away from the grandfather to the other side of town. He hopes that this new book might vindicate his grandfather's name and allow him to visit .

Simon stops by the newspaper to confirm the existence of the new book. At the time, the writer of the article is away and the student is instead greeted by the editor, who is known for stubbornly defending the accuracy of the paper, even in the face of obvious misprints. Simon must not have known this, for he takes the editor at his word and sets off to try to find the book.

At the municipal building Simon is told that the books have all been moved to a private area within the Public and University Library of Geneva so that they can be cleaned and catalogued. The student goes to the library and asks to see the books but is refused. The student insists that he has a right to see the books, and in response he is roughly removed from the library grounds.

Undeterred, the student breaks into the library at night, which he finds surprisingly easy. Inside, he does not find Members of Secret Geneva, and doesn't even notice Moments of Social Geneva, a book so different from his goal that he barely looks at it. The fact of the missing book, rather than enlighten him to the truth, drives Simon to believe that there is a conspiracy to keep him from finding the Members of Secret Geneva. What is more, on trying to exit the library he is caught and put in jail for the night.

The editor, learning that the boy in jail is the same one that had come to visit him, goes to Simon as he is being released. He explains that it was a misprint, that there was no Members of Secret Geneva after all. Simon does not believe the editor, calls him a liar and a betrayer, and spits on him until he leaves.

Over the following weeks there is a series of break-ins at libraries and other public buildings around Geneva. Nothing is ever stolen, but the break-ins increase in destructiveness, with bookcases thrown over, vases and chairs broken, and messages painted on the walls. In response to the crime spree, the reporter that wrote the story about the hidden library is tasked with investigating the crimes. He learns from the editor who the student is and interviews his friends and mother—the student has not been home for nearly a month.

The reporter learns the motivations which are likely driving the crime spree, and he decides to investigate the student's grandfather. He goes to the part of town where the grandfather lives and interviews a number of the older citizens. He discovers that the grandfather is actually held in high regard by all except for his daughter, the student's mother. No one believes he was a French sympathizer, and, in fact, it is public knowledge that he had been a member of Secret Geneva.

Returning to the home of Simon Slatkin, the reporter interviews Simon's mother again without telling her what he has learned. Despite his efforts, he cannot determine whether she was trying to protect the son or extort the grandfather, or if it was a simple case of bad blood. Still unable to find Simon, who has been continuously destroying public buildings, the reporter decides to write an article about the mother and grandfather in hopes of reaching him.

The article is printed on a Sunday, and the student's body is found Monday morning in one of the local museums. The same reporter covers the boy's death. It appeared that, while climbing in through a window, the boy slipped and fell onto a decorative set of armor. He was found lying upright at the base of the grand stairwell, with a sword run through his side.

Analysis
Though not widely considered a "mature prose," and though the construction based on a mistakenly reported book title is widely considered facile, the story has been praised for its complex, uniquely interwoven plot. The physical descriptions of the characters are "particularly visceral and brought to life," and it has been called "a stunning and inexplicably-unheard-of example of pre-post-Modernism."

In this deceptively clear narrative, the close reader will notice moments in the text that are open to interpretation. For example, we are made to believe that the young man Simon Slatkin is the perpetrator of the break-ins and destruction, but there are an equal amount of clues that might suggest that the mother was actually behind it all. Likewise, the reader is meant to question the cause of the student's death, the idea of falling accidentally on a sword seeming less likely than suicide because he found out the truth—an interesting potentiality, though one that is hard to interpret through the lens of the reporter. Still, it is precisely these complications and the potential of new interpretations that have brought the story back into circulation after nearly a century of obscurity.

Contested Authorship
Another reason that the story is still around is the question of its contested authorship. There are a number of reasons that the authorship of "The Unfortunate Son" has been brought into question. Amongst them:

•The loss and recovery of the story seem suspect, as well as the act of giving the story to Molinari—Molinari and Carrascosa were not known to be very close.
•In a letter to Molinari in 1932, Borges wrote, "Looking back, anonymity wasn't so elegant a solution as silence would have been," a purposefully ambiguous regret which is often interpreted as alluding to "The Unfortunate Son." A further consequence of this statement, if it refers to this story, is that there seems to be some guilt on the part of Borges, leading at least one historian to wonder if Borges was the person that recommended visiting the University of Córdoba, the trip which would begin Carrascosa's desperate search for Ocampo Paper.
•Thematically, the story is considered an early incarnation of the ideas that would dominate Borges's work, including detective riddles, the possibility of multiple interpretations, a critique of the intellect (represented by Simon's search for information in books contrasting with the reporter's search in real life), and the presence of a book that may or may not exist, even in the context of the story.
•Borges was raised in Geneva, where the story is set. Carrascosa is not known to have left Argentina. It would seem a more obvious place for Borges to set a story.

Critics of the theory of pseudoepigraphy point out that, although Borges did try to destroy all early copies of many of his early works, at no point did he deny writing them. Nor has any published story of Borges surpassed 20 pages, while "The Unfortunate Son" is nearly 30 pages.

Edwin Dodge has also made the puzzling observation that, "if this story were not by Borges, because of its topic and style, it certainly should have been read by Borges. [...] it was published in a magazine he was closely associated with. It might have proven a great early influence on him. And yet never once did Borges, a man who was fond of alluding to his influences, ever mention Alejandro Carrascosa or 'El hijo desafortunado.' It's almost as if it never existed."

Argentine short stories